"Pass That Dutch" is a song by American rapper Missy Elliott. It was written and produced by Timbaland and Elliott for her fifth studio album, This Is Not a Test! (2003), and contains samples of "Magic Mountain" by War and "Potholes in My Lawn" by De La Soul.

Released as the album's lead single in September 2003, "Pass That Dutch" reached number nine on the US Billboard Rap Songs chart and number 27 on the Billboard Hot 100. It additionally peaked at number 10 in United Kingdom and reached the top 20 in Finland and Norway. The song was ranked first on MuchMusic's "Top 50 MuchVibe Videos of All Time" countdown and 291st on Pitchfork Medias "Top 500 songs of the 2000s".

Music video
The Dave Meyers directed video features Elliott on a farm, dancing under a UFO, on a stage as a beauty queen being cheered on by a crowd of Bratz dolls, in a car where one of the other passengers eats a man after he sets off the car alarm, and on the Empire State Building in a parody of King Kong.  This is the second song where Elliott references Aaliyah, as her picture is on Elliott's desk in the beginning of the music video. The song also features the first verse and chorus of "Wake Up" alongside cameo appearances from former 106 & Park personality Free and Elliott's former protégé Lil' Brianna.

Track listings
 

US 12-inch single
A1. "Pass That Dutch" (amended main version)
A2. "Pass That Dutch" (main version)
A3. "Pass That Dutch" (instrumental)
A4. "Pass That Dutch" (acappella)
B1. "Wake Up" (amended main version)
B2. "Wake Up" (main version)
B3. "Wake Up" (TV track)
B4. "Wake Up" (acappella)

European CD single
 "Pass That Dutch" (explicit version)
 "Hurt Sumthin"

UK and Australian CD single
 "Pass That Dutch" (amended version)
 "Pass That Dutch" (explicit version)
 "Hurt Sumthin"

UK 12-inch single
A1. "Pass That Dutch" (amended version)
A2. "Pass That Dutch" (explicit version)
B1. "Pass That Dutch" (acappella)
B2. "Pass That Dutch" (instrumental)
B3. "Hurt Sumthin"

Charts

Release history

In popular culture
 The song was predated by "Pass the Dutchie", released by Musical Youth in 1982 and "Pass the Kouchie" by the Mighty Diamonds (also 1982)
 The song was featured in the film Mean Girls.
 It was briefly used in an episode of The Catherine Tate Show where Lauren Cooper gets married, the censored version was used.

References

2003 singles
Elektra Records singles
Missy Elliott songs
Music videos directed by Dave Meyers (director)
Song recordings produced by Timbaland
Songs written by Missy Elliott